Kakowal is a village of Mandi Bahauddin District in the Punjab province of Pakistan. Neighbouring settlements include Bhikhi and Wasu. Kakowal is a small countryside containing the population of about 2000 people.

References

Villages in Mandi Bahauddin District